The 602nd Special Operations Squadron was a United States Air Force squadron that operated in Southeast Asia during the Vietnam War.

History

The 602nd Fighter Squadron (Commando) was activated in May 1964 for the Vietnam War, and along with the 1st Air Commando Squadron, was a part of the 34th Tactical Group.  The squadron became operational at Bien Hoa Air Base on 15 October 1964. By 1966 the squadron had been renamed the 602nd Air Commando Squadron and moved, first to Nha Trang Air Base in South Vietnam, and then to Udorn Royal Thai Air Force Base, Thailand.  In March 1968 it moved again to Nakhon Phanom Royal Thai Navy Base.  On 1 August 1968 it was redesignated the 602nd Special Operations Squadron, and was inactivated on 31 December 1970 at Nakhon Phanom.  The original Squadron patch was drawn by Walt Disney in 1944.  The sky was blue with a wisp of cloud behind the left wing of the eagle.  No call sign was mounted above the patch.

The squadron operated A-1 Skyraiders under the call sign "Firefly". Their daylight task was the primary one of combat search and rescue of air crew downed in the Kingdom of Laos. A secondary task was night operations as flareships supporting the Hmong guerrillas of General Vang Pao's Clandestine Army in the Operation Barrel Roll area. At times, the squadron flew single ship sorties; they would also sometimes mark their own targets for their air strikes.

Lineage
 Constituted as the 2nd Fighter Reconnaissance Squadron on 11 April 1944
 Activated on 20 April 1944
 Redesignated 2nd Fighter Squadron, Commando on 2 June 1944
 Inactivated on 12 November 1945
 Disbanded on 8 October 1948
 Reconstituted, redesignated 602nd Fighter Squadron, Commando, and activated on 15 April 1963 (not organized)
 Organized on 1 May 1963
 Redesignated 602nd Special Operations Squadron on 1 August 1968
 Inactivated on 31 December 1970

Assignments

 Third Air Force: 20 April 1944
 2nd Air Commando Group: 22 April 1944 – 12 November 1945
 Tactical Air Command: 15 April 1963 (not organized)
 1st Air Commando Group (later 1st Air Commando Wing): 1 May 1963
 Pacific Air Forces: 1 October 1964
 34th Tactical Group: 18 October 1964
 6251st Tactical Fighter Wing: 8 July 1965
 3rd Tactical Fighter Wing: 21 November 1965
 14th Air Commando Wing: 8 March 1966
 56th Air Commando Wing (later 56th Special Operations Wing): 8 April 1967 – 31 December 1970

Stations

 Lakeland Army Air Field, Florida, 20 April 1944
 Cross City Army Air Field, Florida, 9 June 1944
 Alachua Army Air Field, Florida, 21 June 1944
 Drew Field, Florida, 17 August 1944
 Lakeland Army Air Field, Florida, 22 August 1944 – 23 October 1944
 Kalaikunda, India, 15 December 1944
 Cox's Bazar, India, 13 February 1945
 Kalaikunda, India, 14 May 1945 – 22 October 1945
 Camp Kilmer, New Jersey, 11 November 1945 – 12 November 1945
 Eglin Air Force Base Auxiliary Airfield#9, Florida, 1 May 1963
 Bien Hoa Air Base, Vietnam, 12 Oct 1964
 Nha Trang Air Base, Vietnam, 1 Feb 1966
 Udorn Air Base, Thailand, 15 Dec 1966
 Nakhon Phanom Royal Thai Naval Air Base, Thailand, 30 Jun 1968 – 31 Dec 1970

Aircraft

 North American P-51D Mustang, 1944–1945
 North American F-6 Mustang, 1945
 Douglas B-26B/C Invader, 1963–1964
 Douglas A-1E/G/H/J Skyraider, 1964-1970.

Operations
Combat in CBI Theater, 14 Feb-9 May 1945
Combat in SEA, 1964-1970

Campaign streamers
 World War II:
Central Burma.
 Vietnam:
Vietnam Advisory;
Vietnam Defense;
Vietnam Air;
Vietnam Air Offensive;
Vietnam Air Offensive, Phase II;
Vietnam Air Offensive, Phase III;
Vietnam Air/Ground;
Vietnam Air Offensive, Phase IV;
Tet 69/Counteroffensive;
Vietnam Summer-Fall 1969;
Vietnam Winter-Spring 1970;
Sanctuary Counteroffensive;
Southwest Monsoon;
Commando Hunt V.

Decorations
Distinguished Unit Citation:  Bangkok, Thailand, 15 Mar 1945.
Presidential Unit Citations:  Vietnam:  1 Jul 1965 – 30 Jun 1966; 1 Jul 1966-7 Mar 1967; 12 Apr-30 Jun 1967; 1 Nov 1968 – 1 May 1969; 1 Oct 1969-30 Apr 1970.
Air Force Outstanding Unit Award With Combat "V" Device:  1-31 Dec 1970.
Republic of Vietnam Gallantry Cross with Palm, 1 Apr 1966 – 31 Dec 1970.

References
 Anthony, Victor B. (1973). The Air Force in Southeast Asia: Tactics and Techniques of Night Operations 1961-1970. Office of Air Force History. (2011 reprint). Military Bookshop. ISBNs 1780396570, 978-1780396576.
 Bailey, Carl E., Lineage and Honors History of the 602 Special Operations Squadron USAF Official History; Reviewed by A. Timothy Warnock; AF Historical Research Agency, Maxwell AFB, Alabama 2005.
 Marrett, George J. (2002). Cheating Death: Combat Air Rescues in Vietnam and Laos. Smithsonian Institution Press. .

Footnotes

602